Come a Little Closer may refer to:

"Come a Little Closer" (Dierks Bentley song)
"Come a Little Closer" (Cage the Elephant song)
"Come a Little Closer" (The Desert Rose Band song)
Come a Little Closer (album), an album by Etta James
Come a Little Closer, a 2018 novel by Rachel Abbott

See also
"Come a Little Bit Closer", a song by Jay and the Americans